Lyudmila Ninova-Rudoll (born 25 June 1960 in Kula, Bulgaria) is a retired Bulgarian–Austrian long jumper. She competed for Bulgaria until the end of 1987 and began representing Austria from the start of 1988.

Her personal best jump was 7.09 metres, achieved in June 1994 in Seville. This is the Austrian record. She also holds the Austrian triple jump record with 13.75 metres.

International competitions

References

External links
 

1960 births
Living people
Bulgarian female long jumpers
Bulgarian female triple jumpers
Austrian female long jumpers
Austrian female triple jumpers
Olympic athletes of Austria
Athletes (track and field) at the 1992 Summer Olympics
Athletes (track and field) at the 1996 Summer Olympics
World Athletics Championships athletes for Bulgaria
World Athletics Championships athletes for Austria
Universiade medalists in athletics (track and field)
Austrian people of Bulgarian descent
People from Kula, Bulgaria
Universiade silver medalists for Bulgaria
Medalists at the 1987 Summer Universiade
Bulgarian emigrants to Austria